The Edmonton Eskimos are a Canadian Football League team, known since 2021 as the Edmonton Elks.

Edmonton Eskimos may also refer to:

Edmonton Rugby Foot-ball Club, known at times as the Eskimos
Edmonton Eskimos Football Club (1938)
Edmonton Eskimos (baseball)
Edmonton Eskimos (ice hockey)